Wilfred Rickman (1849 – 6 June 1911) was an Australian cricketer. He played one first-class cricket match for Lancashire in 1876 and one match for Victoria in 1881.

See also
 List of Victoria first-class cricketers
 List of Lancashire County Cricket Club players

References

External links
 

1849 births
1911 deaths
Australian cricketers
Lancashire cricketers
Victoria cricketers
Cricketers from Melbourne